The Manchester Open previously known as the Northern Lawn Tennis Championships, the Northern Championships, the  Northern Tennis Tournament and the Manchester Trophy was a grass court tennis tournament on the ATP Tour held at the Northern Lawn Tennis Club, in the Didsbury suburb of Manchester, Great Britain. The tournament had been held annually from 1880 to 2009. 

Prior to the creation of the International Lawn Tennis Federation and the establishment of its world championship events in 1913 it was considered by players and historians one of the four most important tennis tournaments to win. the others being Wimbledon, the U.S. National championships and the Irish Championships. Between 1970 and 1989 it was part of the men's Grand Prix tennis tour.

History
The first edition in July 1880 was held at the Broughton Cricket Club while the Kersal Cricket Ground staged the 1881 event. The 1882 edition was the first one to be held in Liverpool and saw the addition of the women's singles event, won by May Langrishe, as well as the women's and mixed doubles events. Prior to the creation of the International Lawn Tennis Federation and the establishment of its world championship events in 1913 it was considered by players and historians one of the four most important tennis tournaments to win. the others being Wimbledon, the U.S. National championships and the Irish Championships. From its inception until 1927 the location of the tournament alternated between Manchester and Liverpool. Between 1970 and 1989 it was part of the men's Grand Prix Tennis Tour known throughout the 1980s as the Greater Manchester Grass Court Tennis Championships. In 1990 it became an ATP Tour event as part of the ATP International Series until 1994. In 1995 the tournament was moved to Nottingham and continued as an ATP World Series event. The current Manchester Trophy Challenger is part of the ATP Challenger Tour; throughout its history the event has been won by a number of Wimbledon champions such as Pete Sampras, who won his first grass court title there. The tournament ended in 2009.

Past finals

Men's singles

Men's doubles

Notes

External links
http://www.lta.org.uk/Manchester LTA Northern Lawn Tennis Club: Accessed 17/09/2011.
The Northern Lawn Tennis Club Manchester: Accessed 17/09/2011.
Championship Roll of Honour. Accessed 8/11/2011.

 
Tennis tournaments in England
Grass court tennis tournaments
ATP Tour
Sport in Manchester
Recurring sporting events established in 1989
Defunct tennis tournaments in the United Kingdom